Shitai County is a county in the south of Anhui Province, People's Republic of China, under the jurisdiction of the prefecture-level city of Chizhou. The government of Shitai County is located in Qili Town. Shitai County is a producer of silk and tea leaves.

The well-known "Guniujiang" National Nature Reserve is located on the border between Shitai County and Qimen County. It is said that the "Guniujiang" has the last piece of original forest in East China.

Administrative divisions
Shitai County has jurisdiction over six towns and two townships.

Towns:
Renli, Hengdu, Xianyu, Qidu, Xiaohe, Dingxiang

Townships:
Dayan Township, Jitan Township

Climate

References

County-level divisions of Anhui
Chizhou